is a Shintō shrine in Fukuoka .

History

During the first Mongol invasion on November 19, 1274 (Bun'ei 11, 20th day of the 10th month), the Japanese defenders were pushed back from the several landing sites. In the ensuing skirmishes, the shrine was burned to the ground. When the shrine was reconstructed, a calligraphy Tekikoku kōfuku (敵国降伏; surrender of the enemy nation) was put on the tower gate.  The calligraphy was written by Emperor Daigo, dedicated by Emperor Daijo Kameyama as a supplication to Hachiman to defeat invaders.

The shrine is highly ranked among the many shrines in Japan. It was listed in Engishiki-jinmyōchō (延喜式神名帳) edited in 927. In 11th or 12th century, the shrine was ranked as Ichinomiya (一宮; first shrine) of Chikuzen Province.

From 1871 to 1946, Hakozaki was officially designated a Kanpei-taisha (官幣大社), in the first rank of government supported shrines. Other similar Hachiman shrines were Iwashimizu Hachimangū of Yawata in Kyoto Prefecture and Usa Shrine of Usa in Ōita Prefecture.

Shinto belief
Hakozaki Shrine is dedicated to the veneration of the kami Hachiman.  This shrine especially venerates the memory of Emperor Ōjin, Empress Jingū and Tamayori-bime.

Treasures

A number of structures in the shrine complex have been designated as important cultural assets of Japan, including the main hall, the worship hall, tower gate and the main Torii, Ichino-torii. This torii gate was demolished in 2018, as it became too expensive to repair after pieces started to fall off. It has not been replaced.

Festivals
The annual Tamaseseri Festival (January 3) and the Hojoya Festival (September 12–18) attract many visitors to the shrine.

See also
 List of Shinto shrines
 Japanese mythology
 Ugayafukiaezu

Notes

References

 Davis, Paul K. (1999).  100 Decisive Battles: From Ancient Times to the Present. Oxford: Oxford University Press. ; 
 Ponsonby-Fane, Richard Arthur Brabazon. (1962).   Studies in Shinto and Shrines. Kyoto: Ponsonby Memorial Society. OCLC 399449
 Turnbull, Stephen R. (2003).  Genghis Khan & the Mongol Conquests, 1190-1400. London: Taylor & Francis.

External links

   Hakozaki Shrine website
   Fukuoka/Hakata Tourist Information website, Hakozaki Shrine, images + video

Kanpei-taisha
Beppyo shrines
Shinto shrines in Fukuoka Prefecture
Buildings and structures in Fukuoka
Tourist attractions in Fukuoka
Hachiman shrines
Religious buildings and structures completed in 921